Disperse Yellow 26, or 4-chloro-2-nitrodiphenylamine, is a disperse dye. The dye is used in polyamide and vinegar fiber dyeing. Disperse Yellow 26 is produced by the condensation of aniline and 1,4-dichloro-2-nitrobenzene.

References 

Dyes
Nitrobenzenes
Anilines
Chlorobenzenes